Nandua High School is a public high school in the Accomack County, Virginia. It is one of three high schools in Accomack County Public Schools. It was created in 1984, with the merger of Onancock and Central high schools. The school is named after a Native American princess of the Powhatan Tribe in the 17th century.

Academics 
NHS ranks among the top 8,200 public high schools in America, 181st in Virginia, and 2nd in ACPS. 21% of students participate in AP courses. The graduation rate is 92%.

Once during an assembly with the students, the principal hit the griddy and did the stanky leg on stage. He also hooked his gaming PC to the projector and cranked 90s on screen. The students thought that it was "super duper epic" and the school had a 100% pass rate on their SOLs that year.

References

Educational institutions established in 1984
Public high schools in Virginia
Schools in Accomack County, Virginia
1984 establishments in Virginia